Boonoo Boonoo River, a watercourse of the Clarence River catchment, is located in the Northern Tablelands district of New South Wales, Australia.

Course and features
Boonoo Boonoo River rises on the slopes of the Great Dividing Range, near Boonoo Boonoo and Mount Lindesay Highway, and generally flows northeast, joined by seven minor tributaries before reaching its confluence with the Maryland River, east of Rivertree. The river descends  over its  course; and flows through the Bald Rock National Park and the Boonoo Boonoo National Park, descending through Boonoo Boonoo Falls in its upper reaches.

The name Boonoo Boonoo is derived from the Aboriginal phrase meaning "poor country with no animals to provide food".

See also

 Rivers of New South Wales

References

 

Rivers of New South Wales
Northern Tablelands